Coyame (formally: Santiago de Coyame) is a town in the  Mexican state of Chihuahua. It serves as the municipal seat of Coyame del Sotol Municipality. 

In the 2010 INEGI Census, the town reported a total population of 709.   

It was founded in 1715 by the Spanish explorer Juan Antonio Traviña y Retes.

Coyame is also the location of a hot spring and a cave system.

See also
Coyame UFO Incident of 1974

References

Populated places in Chihuahua (state)
Populated places established in 1715
1715 establishments in the Spanish Empire